Imperial Palace is the last and longest novel by author Arnold Bennett.

Published in 1930, the year before Bennett's death, the novel follows the daily workings of a hotel modelled on the Savoy Hotel in London. The central character, Evelyn Orcham, is the director of the hotel.

While the novel was successful in its time, it was overshadowed by Vicki Baum's best-selling novel, Menschen im Hotel (People in a Hotel) published the same year and later turned into the Academy Award winning film, Grand Hotel.

Bennett's second novel, The Grand Babylon Hotel published in 1902, was also set in an institution modelled on the Savoy Hotel.

External links
 

1930 British novels
Novels by Arnold Bennett
Novels set in London
Novels set in hotels
Cassell (publisher) books